Le Grutléen was a Swiss socialist weekly newspaper published in the French language in Lausanne, and linked to the Socialist Party of Vaud.

It was founded on 15 October 1909 under the influence of Paul Golay and Chaux-de-Fonnier Charles Naine, with Golay serving as editor.

On 1 May 1917, the Grütli Society broke away from the Swiss Socialist Party. As a result, the newspaper was replaced by Le Droit du Peuple (English:  The Right of the People).

See also

 List of newspapers in Switzerland

References

1900s establishments in Switzerland
Defunct newspapers published in Switzerland
Defunct weekly newspapers
French-language newspapers published in Switzerland
Mass media in Lausanne
Newspapers established in 1909
Publications with year of disestablishment missing
Socialist newspapers
Weekly newspapers published in Switzerland